Snatch is a crime comedy-drama streaming television series based on the film of the same name, and that premiered on March 16, 2017, on Crackle. The series was created by Alex De Rakoff and stars Luke Pasqualino, Rupert Grint, Lucien Laviscount, Phoebe Dynevor, Juliet Aubrey, Marc Warren, Stephanie Leonidas, Tamer Hassan, and Dougray Scott.

Premise
Snatch follows a group of young scammers who find themselves with a truck loaded with stolen gold bullion and are soon involved in the world of organized crime.

Cast and characters

Main
 Luke Pasqualino as Albert Hill, a Cockney hustler.
 Rupert Grint as Charlie Cavendish-Scott, Albert's partner in crime who comes from an aristocratic family.
 Lucien Laviscount as Billy 'Fuckin' Ayres, a local half-Irish Traveller boxer and Albert and Charlie's friend.
 Phoebe Dynevor as Lotti Mott, Sonny Castillo's moll who desperately wants out and decides to help Albert and Charlie in their scheme.
 Juliet Aubrey as Lily Hill, Albert's mother.
 Marc Warren as DI Bob Fink (season 1), a corrupt police inspector who operates as a local crime lord.
 Stephanie Leonidas as Chloe Koen (season 1), a local gold dealer whom Charlie fancies.
 Tamer Hassan as Hate 'Em, Vic's cellmate in prison.
 Dougray Scott as Vic Hill, Albert's father, a legendary bank robber who still runs things from inside prison.

Recurring

Episodes

Series overview

Season 1 (2017)

Season 2 (2018)

Production

Development
On April 20, 2016, it was announced that Crackle had given a series order to a television series adaptation of Guy Ritchie's 2000 film Snatch for a first season consisting of ten episodes. On August 22, 2016, it was announced that the series was created by Alex De Rakoff who was also set to serve as the show's head writer and an executive producer. It was additionally announced that Helen Flint would act as a producer for the series, Nick Renton would direct, and that production companies involved with the series were expected to include Little Island Productions. 
Principal photography for season one was expected to commence during the week of August 29, 2016 in Manchester, England.

On April 19, 2017, it was announced that Crackle had renewed the series for a second season. On July 24, 2018, it was announced that season two would premiere on September 13, 2018.

Casting
In August 2016, it was announced that Rupert Grint, Dougray Scott, Luke Pasqualino, and Lucien Laviscount had been cast in the series' lead roles and that Ed Westwick would appear in a recurring capacity. On September 23, 2016, it was reported that Phoebe Dynevor had been cast in series regular role. On February 7, 2018, it was announced that Úrsula Corberó had been cast in a recurring role for the second season.

Release
On January 13, 2017, the first trailer for the series was released. On August 22, 2018, the official trailer for the second season was released.

On March 9, 2017, the series held its world premiere at the ArcLight Culver City movie theater in Culver City, California. On September 28, 2017, the series held its British premiere at the BT Tower in Fitzrovia, London, England. On October 31, 2017, the series premiered on AMC in the United Kingdom.

Reception

Critical response
The first season was met with a mixed to negative response from critics upon its debut. On the review aggregation website Rotten Tomatoes, the series holds a 33% approval rating with an average rating of 4.61 out of 10 based on 15 reviews. The website's critical consensus reads, "Snatch won't grab you." Metacritic, which uses a weighted average, assigned the series a score of 55 out of 100 based on 10 critics, indicating "mixed or average reviews".

Awards and nominations

References

External links
 

2017 American television series debuts
2018 American television series endings
2010s American drama television series
Crackle (streaming service) original programming
English-language television shows
Television series by Sony Pictures Television
Live action television shows based on films